Centre de services scolaire Marie-Victorin (CSSMV) is a French-language school service centre operating in the Province of Quebec, Canada and serving the tables of Longueuil (boroughs of Le Vieux-Longueuil, Saint-Hubert and Greenfield Park), Brossard and Saint-Lambert. CSSMV (previously known as "CSMV: Commission scolaire Marie-Victorin") was established on July 1, 1998, and became one of the most important school centres in Quebec. 
The board's headquarters are in Longueuil.

CSSMV was created in 2020 when Commission scolaire Marie-Victorin school board was abolished according to Bill 40, which replaced all French school boards with service centres. The centre now serves 34,000 students and employs 4,500 people in 72 schools. About 53% of its clientele represents immigrants and 31,3% of students do not have French as their mother tongue.

The school board was named for Marie-Victorin Kirouac (1885-1944).

District Brossard

Elementary schools
 Charles-Bruneau
 Georges-P.-Vanier
 Guillaume-Vignal
 Marie-Victorin
 Sainte-Claire
 Saint-Laurent
 Samuel-De Champlain
 Tourterelle
 Marcelle-Gauvreau

Secondary schools
 École secondaire Antoine-Brossard
 École internationale Lucille-Teasdale

District St-Lambert

Elementary schools
 des Saints-Anges
 Préville
 Rabeau

District Greenfield Park

Elementary schools
 Centre hospitalier Charles-LeMoyne
 École internationale de Greenfield Park
 Pierre-Laporte

Secondary school
 École secondaire Saint-Edmond

District Saint-Hubert

Elementary schools
 Charles-LeMoyne
 de La Mosaïque
 De Maricourt
 des Mille-Fleurs
 des Quatre-Saisons
 D’Iberville
 du Jardin-Bienville
 Gaétan-Boucher
 Laurent-Benoît
 Maurice-L.-Duplessis
 Monseigneur-Forget
 Paul-Chagnon
 Saint-Joseph

Secondary schools
 École secondaire André-Laurendeau
 École secondaire Mgr-A.-M.-Parent
 École secondaire participative l’Agora

District Le Vieux-Longueuil

Elementary schools
 Adrien-Gamache
 Armand-Racicot
 Bel-Essor
 Bourgeoys-Champagnat
 Carillon
 Christ-Roi
 de Normandie
 du Curé-Lequin
 du Tournesol
 École des Petits-Explorateurs
 Félix-Leclerc
 Gentilly
 Gentilly (Boisé des lutins)
 George-Étienne-Cartier
 Hubert-Perron
 Jacques-Ouellette
 Joseph-De-Sérigny
 Lajeunesse
 des Remparts
 Lionel-Groulx
 Marie-Victorin (Longueuil) Pavillon le Jardin
 Marie-Victorin (Longueuil) Pavillon l’Herbier
 Paul-De Maricourt
 Pierre-D’Iberville
 Sainte-Claire
 Saint-Jude
 Saint-Romain

Secondary schools
 École secondaire Gérard-Filion
 École secondaire Jacques-Rousseau
 École secondaire Saint-Jean-Baptiste
 École des Remparts (Le Vieux-Longueuil)
 Gérard-Filion (Pavillon l’Entre-Rives) (Le Vieux-Longueuil)
 École Jacques-Ouellette (Le Vieux-Longueuil)
 École régionale du Vent-Nouveau

References

External links
Commission scolaire Marie-Victorin 

Education in Longueuil
School districts in Quebec